Meenakshi Shinde is Shiv Sena Politician from Thane district, Maharashtra. She is the former Mayor of Thane Municipal Corporation. She has been elected to Thane Municipal Corporation for three consecutive terms from 2007 to 2017.

Positions held
 2007: Elected as corporator in Thane Municipal Corporation
 2012: Re-elected as corporator in Thane Municipal Corporation 
 2017: Re-elected as corporator in Thane Municipal Corporation 
 2017: Elected as Mayor of Thane Municipal Corporation

References

External links
 Shivsena Home Page
 ठाणे महानगरपालिका पदाधिकारी

Living people
Mayors of Thane
Shiv Sena politicians
People from Thane district
Marathi politicians
Maharashtra politicians
Year of birth missing (living people)